Stanley Climbfall is the second studio album by American rock band Lifehouse. It was released on September 17, 2002, through DreamWorks Records. Produced by Ron Aniello, who also produced the band's first record, No Name Face (2000), the album features a more complex and heavier rock sound, and is considered the heaviest release in the Lifehouse's discography. Supported by the singles "Spin" and "Take Me Away", the album debuted at number seven on the Billboard 200, but did not perform as well commercially as No Name Face. "Take Me Away" peaked at number 22 on Billboard's Adult Pop Songs chart. Stanley Climbfall has sold over one million copies domestically.

Critical reception 

Stanley Climbfall received mixed reviews from critics, who both praised and criticized lead singer Jason Wade's songwriting and the album's repetitive sound. Billboard published a positive review of the album, with writer L. F. describing it as "as close to bullet-proof as one can get...meticulously measured and carefully designed" and Wade as a "top-shelf songwriter" with a "knack for weaving smarter-than-average lyrics into tightly constructed, instantly memorable melodies."
 Josh Tyrangiel of Entertainment Weekly called the album "Charming harmlessness" with "Wade us[ing] his Vedderesque baritone to dress the usual word salad of sadness, alienation, and overcoming sadness and alienation." He pinpointed "Spin", "Take Me Away", and "Out of Breath" as standout tracks on the album.

In contrast, AllMusics Dean Carlson felt the album was "exhausting", given that several other bands had a similar sound, and felt that Aniello and Brendan O'Brien's production "transform[ed] possible sincerity into self-importance and drain[ed] the band of any real individuality."

Commercial performance
Stanley Climbfall debuted at number seven on the Billboard 200 in the United States, with 74,000 copies sold. In its second week on the ranking, it charted at number 30 with a further 26,000 copies sold. According to Nielsen SoundScan, 285,000 cumulative copies of the album were sold in the country by February 2003. Four months later, sales reached the 300,000 mark, "a definite comedown" from the band's debut album No Name Face (2000). The album's domestic commercial performance was attributed in part to a lack of promotion—the band went on tour in Europe first, at the direction of its label, to "make up" for previously only touring for a week in the territory in support of No Name Face—and the absence "of a breakout hit on the scale of 'Hanging By A Moment". In response, Wade said that the album was "not about sales, but rather furthering his craft and maturing as an artist". In November 2009, Billboard reported that sales of the album had reached 411,000 copies in the US. It eventually surpassed 1 million sales domestically.

Track listing

Personnel
Lifehouse
 Jason Wade – vocals, guitars
 Sergio Andrade – bass
 Rick Woolstenhulme, Jr. – drums

Production
 Ron Aniello – producer
 Brendan O'Brien – mixing

Charts

Weekly charts

Year-end charts

References

2002 albums
Albums produced by Ron Aniello
Lifehouse (band) albums
DreamWorks Records albums
Interscope Geffen A&M Records albums